The New Territories North East geographical constituency is one of the ten geographical constituencies in the elections for the Legislative Council of Hong Kong which elects two members of the Legislative Council using the single non-transferable vote (SNTV) system. The constituency covers Tai Po District and western part of Sha Tin District in New Territories.

History
The constituency was created under the overhaul of the electoral system imposed by the Beijing government in 2021, replacing Tai Po District and western part of Sha Tin District (all District Council constituencies not covered by New Territories South East) of the New Territories East used from 1998 to 2021. A constituency with the same name were also created for the 1995 Legislative Council election in the late colonial period.

Returning members

Election results

2020s

References 

Constituencies of Hong Kong
New Territories
Constituencies of Hong Kong Legislative Council
2021 establishments in Hong Kong
Constituencies established in 2021